Nehemiah Bourne (baptised 26 January 1611, died 1691) was an English naval officer, administrator and ship-owner who fought for Parliament during the Wars of the Three Kingdoms. He has been described as "a typical servant of the Commonwealth, a committed radical, energetic, public spirited, yet with a shrewd eye to personal profit." 

Originally from Wapping, he emigrated to Massachusetts in 1638, before returning to England in 1644 to take part in the First English Civil War. He later served with the Commonwealth navy during the Anglo-Scottish war (1650–1652) and First Anglo-Dutch War before being appointed to the Navy Office in December 1652. He retained this position until the 1660 Stuart Restoration, and thereafter focused on commercial activities until his death sometime between February and May 1691 in London.

Personal details
Nehemiah Bourne was born in Wapping, close to the Port of London, eldest son of Mary Bourne (died 1630) and her husband Robert (died 1625), a wealthy shipwright. Baptised on 26 January 1611, he was one of five surviving children, the others being Mary (born 1607), Martha (born 1609), Ruth (born 1616) and John (1620–1667), who later served under his brother in the Commonwealth navy. 

He married Hannah Earning (1616–1684) in 1631, and they had five children. Two were still living when he made his will in February 1691, a son Nehemiah (1640–1709), and daughter Anna. His brother-in-law, Anthony Earning, was also a captain in the Commonwealth navy from 1651 to 1660.

Career
Bourne followed his father into the family business and was part of a close-knit group of Puritan merchants and shipowners, among them future Parliamentarian soldier, sailor and political radical, Thomas Rainsborough. The period of Personal Rule exercised by Charles I from 1629 to 1640 led many Puritans to emigrate to New England, including Bourne. In 1638, he journeyed to Massachusetts in a ship owned by the Rainsborough family, and established a ship-building company in Boston.

The First English Civil War began in August 1642, and in the winter of 1643/1644, Bourne travelled to England where he was appointed major in a regiment of infantry raised by Thomas Rainsborough for the Eastern Association. Several members of this unit were returned emigrants like Bourne, among them Israel Stoughton, John Leverett, a future Governor of Massachusetts, and Stephen Winthrop, son of John Winthrop, the current governor. In October 1644, he took part in a daring operation led by Rainsborough to expel a Royalist garrison from Crowland Abbey, before resigning his commission in early 1645 and returning to Boston. 

 

One reason for doing so may have been his Anabaptist beliefs or sympathies, which he shared with Thomas Rainsborough. Viewed as dangerous radicals by mainstream Protestants, including the moderate Presbyterians who dominated Parliament and had to approve the appointment of officers to the New Model Army, Anabaptists were widely persecuted in both Europe and the North American colonies. These factors may have influenced both Bourne and Leverett, who returned to Boston at the same time. The two men campaigned for John Winthrop to amend Massachusetts laws banning Anabaptists; after these efforts failed, in December 1646 Bourne sailed for England with his family, this time permanently.       

Over the next few years, Bourne was busy building up his trade with New England, and although offered a position within the Commonwealth navy in 1649, it was not until 1650 that he accepted command of the Speaker. During the 1650 to 1652 Anglo-Scottish war, he was commander-in-chief of the North Sea Squadron, providing support for land operations in Scotland, his brother John being captain of one of his ships. This was also a period of tension between the Commonwealth and Dutch Republic over trade, and in May 1652 Bourne was senior officer in The Downs when a Dutch fleet under Maarten Tromp anchored near Dover. Now using the Andrew as his flagship, Bourne immediately informed his commander Admiral Robert Blake. This initiated the inconclusive Battle of Dover on 19 May 1652, although the First Anglo-Dutch War did not formally begin until 10 July. 

Promoted Rear admiral, on 28 September Bourne also commanded a squadron at the Battle of the Kentish Knock, but despite his good performance in the two battles, it was decided his talents were more urgently needed in administration. In December 1652, he was appointed one of three Commissioners at the Navy Office, responsible for managing the crews, ship repairs and marine supplies. He proved efficient enough to retain this position until the Stuart Restoration in May 1660, when he was replaced by the new regime. Although given permission in 1662 to return to New England with his family, his concerns over the treatment of Anabaptists there remained, and in the end he settled first in Hamburg, then Rotterdam. Bourne moved to Abchurch Lane in London around 1670, where he lived until his death sometime between February and May 1691. As stipulated in his will, he was buried next to his wife Hannah in Bunhill Fields, a graveyard used for Nonconformists.

References

Sources
 
 
 
 

Royal Navy rear admirals
English merchants
1611 births
1691 deaths
Parliamentarian military personnel of the English Civil War
People from Wapping